
Gmina Łączna is a rural gmina (administrative district) in Skarżysko County, Świętokrzyskie Voivodeship, in south-central Poland.

The gmina contains part of the protected area called Suchedniów-Oblęgorek Landscape Park.

Villages
Gmina Łączna contains the villages and settlements of Czerwona Górka, Gózd, Jaśle, Jęgrzna, Kamionki, Klonów, Łączna, Osełków, Podłazie, Podzagnańszcze, Stawik, Występa, Zagórze, Zalezianka and Zaskale.

Buildings and structures 
North of Gózd, there is at  a 104 metres tall free-standing lattice tower used as radio relay.

Neighbouring gminas
Gmina Łączna is bordered by the gminas of Bliżyn, Bodzentyn, Masłów, Suchedniów and Zagnańsk.

References
Polish official population figures 2006

Laczna
Skarżysko County